Neil Freeman (born 16 February 1955) is an English former footballer who played as a goalkeeper in the Football League. He started his career as a youth player at home-town club Northampton Town, but turned professional with Arsenal in 1972. He was released in March 1974 without having played for the first team. He then played for Grimsby Town, Southend United, Birmingham City, Walsall, Huddersfield Town, Peterborough United and Northampton Town.

After retiring from football, he joined the police.

References

English footballers
Association football goalkeepers
English Football League players
Arsenal F.C. players
Grimsby Town F.C. players
Southend United F.C. players
Birmingham City F.C. players
Walsall F.C. players
Huddersfield Town A.F.C. players
Peterborough United F.C. players
Northampton Town F.C. players
1955 births
Living people
Footballers from Northampton